White shrimp may refer to

"Atlantic white shrimp" – Litopenaeus setiferus
"Pacific white shrimp" (Litopenaeus vannamei) - whiteleg shrimp
"Indian white shrimp" (Penaeus indicus) - Indian prawn
"Chinese white shrimp" (Penaeus chinensis)
 , "gamba blanca" in Spanish

Edible crustaceans
Animal common name disambiguation pages